From the beginning of organised motor sport events, in the early 1900s, until the late 1960s, before commercial sponsorship liveries came into common use, vehicles competing in Formula One, sports car racing, touring car racing and other international auto racing competitions customarily painted their cars in standardised racing colours that indicated the nation of origin of the car or driver.  These were often quite different from the national colours used in other sports or in politics.

History

1900s

The colours have their origin in the national teams competing in the Gordon Bennett Cup, which was held annually in 1900-1905. Count Eliot Zborowski, father of inter-war racing legend Louis Zborowski, suggested that each national entrant be allotted a different colour. The first competition in 1900 assigned: Blue to France, Yellow to Belgium, White to Germany and Red to the United States. (Italy did not adopt its famous 'Racing Red' until a red Fiat won the Grand Prix race in 1907).

When Britain first competed in 1902, it had to choose a different colour from her national colours of red, white and blue, as these had already been allocated. Selwyn Edge's winning Napier of 1902 was painted olive green, and green was well-established as an appropriate colour for locomotives and machinery, in which Britain had led the world during the previous century.   When Britain hosted the 1903 Gordon Bennett Cup the following year on a closed course at Athy in Ireland, the British adopted Shamrock green which later evolved into various shades of 'British racing green'.

1920s–1960s

Colours were definitely established in the Interwar period of Grand Prix motor racing and listed by the AiACr (the forerunner of the FIA), when the Bleu de France Bugattis and the Rosso Corsa Alfa Romeos of Italy won many races, while the British racing green Bentleys dominated the Le Mans Grand Prix d'Endurance until 1930.

In the 1930s the Mercedes-Benz and Auto Union teams did not apply the traditional German white paint, and their bare sheets of metal gave rise to the term Silver Arrows.   A myth developed in the 1930s that the German teams did not apply white paint owing to the need to be under the 750 kg maximum weight limit; however the first "Silver Arrows" raced in 1932, before the weight limit was imposed in 1934.  Modern monocoque aircraft fuselage construction was already using polished and unpainted aluminium panels at this period, and the wealthy motor-racing fraternity would also have been aware that in Heraldry, White and Silver are the same colour or 'tincture', described as 'Argent'; (similarly Yellow and Gold are both called 'Or').

Post-war colours were defined in terms of body, bonnet, chassis, numbers and their backgrounds (see diagrams below). When the chassis was no longer exposed, the chassis colour was shown in various ways, e.g. the parallel blue stripes of the Cunningham team and other US teams in the 1950s. Porsche in the 1950s and 1960s also retained the silver colouring, although other German teams in the 1960s (such as BMW) returned to white paint.

During this period, the colour was not determined by the country the car was made in nor by the nationality of the driver(s) but by the nationality of the team entering the vehicle, e.g. Stirling Moss drove three races during the 1954 season in a British racing green Maserati 250F because the Italian-built car was entered by the British privateer teams Equipe Moss and A.E.Moss respectively. However, this general rule was not strictly kept. Australian Jack Brabham and New Zealander Bruce McLaren, for instance, who both based and licensed their teams in Britain, used colour schemes on their early cars that were not based on national principles (namely the Brabham BT3, McLaren M2B, McLaren M4B and McLaren M5A cars), while the British Rob Walker privateer team entered cars in Scottish national colours (blue with a white stripe) instead of the British racing green.

Sponsorship era – from 1968

Team Gunston, a South African privateer team, was the first Formula One team to paint their cars in the livery of their sponsors when they entered a private Brabham for John Love, painted in the colours of Gunston cigarettes, in the 1968 South African Grand Prix. In the next race, the 1968 Spanish Grand Prix, Team Lotus became the first works team to follow this example, with Graham Hill's Lotus 49B entered in the red, gold and white colors of Imperial Tobacco's Gold Leaf brand. British Racing Green soon vanished from the cars of British teams.

The old colour scheme was abandoned by the FIA for most racing disciplines in the 1970s.

Contemporary usage

Traditional colours are still used by automakers and teams that want to emphasise their racing traditions, especially by Italian, British and German manufacturers.

The Rosso Corsa has been used uninterruptedly by Italian manufacturers Ferrari and Alfa Romeo.

Since the 1990s, other traditional colours have resurfaced, such as the British racing green F1 Jaguar Racing cars and Aston Martin sports cars, and the white F1 BMW Sauber. German manufacturers like Mercedes-Benz and Audi (Auto Union) used silver paint when they returned to international racing in the 1990s. Many concept cars follow the old colour schemes, and most amateur racers prefer them as well.

Often, sponsorship agreements respect traditional colours. For example, Ferrari has had major sponsors which also use red colours, like Marlboro and Santander. In contrast, when tobacco company West sponsored McLaren in the 1990s and 2000s, they did not use their colours, but the "Silver Arrows" from engine provider Mercedes. In a reversed situation, Subaru has continued using blue and yellow liveries well after their 555 sponsorship ended.

Some manufacturers prefer colours different from their national colours. For example, Citroën has traditionally used red, Renault and Opel have used yellow and black, and Volkswagen has used blue and white.

The EFDA Nations Cup, running 1990–1998, was a one make racing series with a total of at least 20 countries, predominantly European ones, being represented.

The annual A1 Grand Prix series of 2005–2009 featured national teams, driving identical cars with differing colour schemes. Initially, most schemes were based on the respective national flags; some teams with different traditional sporting colours have since switched, including A1 Team Australia and A1 Team India. The old national racing colours were not so popular among these teams.

Honda's range of street-legal Type-R vehicles are offered in Championship White (Honda colour code NH0) which is similar to the original white that adorned Honda's first F1 car (Honda RA272) driven by Richie Ginther that secured Honda's first ever F1 win in the 1965 Mexican Grand Prix.

Historic colours

Major competitors 

These have stuck as a pattern, and are common outside of international Grand Prix racing.

National list 

The following schemes have been adopted for various countries at various times:

See also

Racing stripe on notes about USA racing colours.

References

Further reading

External links

 

International auto racing colors
international auto racing
International colours
Auto racing
Vehicle markings
Liveries